Manikarnikeswarar Temple is a Hindu temple located in the town of Thanjavur, India. The temple was constructed by Serfoji II in 1827. The principal deity is Manikarnikeswarar and the goddess, Mangala Nayaki Amman.

References

Hindu temples in Thanjavur